Nigel William Gleghorn (born 12 August 1962) is an English former professional footballer who played as a forward or central midfielder.

Career
Gleghorn worked as a firefighter, playing part-time for his local club Seaham Red Star in the Northern League Division Two, until successful trials at Ipswich Town led to the offer of a professional contract.
Reluctant to give up a steady job in the fire service to risk failing as a footballer, his wife convinced him to take the chance.
Within weeks the 23-year-old Gleghorn was making his debut in the First Division away to Arsenal. After three seasons at Portman Road he moved on to Manchester City.

He spent one season at Manchester City in which the side were promoted to the First Division, but after only a few games back in the top flight Gleghorn was sold to Birmingham City, recently relegated to the Third Division, for a relatively big fee of £175,000. He stayed for three seasons, helping the team to victory in the Football League Trophy final at Wembley in 1991 and promotion to the newly designated Division One in 1991–92. In that season he was Birmingham's top scorer with 22 goals in all competitions and scored the winner against Shrewsbury in the last home game of the season when the club needed a win to be sure of automatic promotion.

Gleghorn signed for Stoke City in October 1992 and made his debut in the Potteries derby against Port Vale in which Stoke won 2–1. Stoke went on to win the Second Division title in 1992–93 with Gleghorn playing a major role in the team's success. Manager Lou Macari left for Celtic and under Joe Jordan Gleghorn was restricted to a more defensive role in the side in 1993–94 a role which he did not enjoy. Once Macari returned to Stoke in 1994–95 Gleghorn returned to his more free role in the side and an improved Stoke side finished 11th in 1994–95. He was an ever-present in 1995–96 playing in 56 matches scoring ten goals as Stoke reached the play-offs where they lost to Leicester City. He was released at the end of the season with the club looking to reduce their wage bill ahead of their move to the Britannia Stadium and Gleghorn joined Burnley. He retired in 1998 after a season at Turf Moor and loan spells with Brentford and Northampton Town.

Post retirement
Once his full-time football career finished Gleghorn went to work full-time in the Sports Studies department of a further education college. Meanwhile, he involved himself with coaching and management. Following an unsuccessful few months as player-coach at Altrincham – though after he left the club went on to win the Northern Premier League – he joined Witton Albion in the Northern Premier League First Division as player-manager. In his first season the club finished level on points with the top two teams, missing out on promotion only on goal difference. He then had three years at Nantwich Town in the North West Counties League, leaving when they wanted him to take the job full-time, followed by runners-up spot in the same league with Newcastle Town, still as player-manager, from where he was sacked in 2006.

Though not currently managing a club, he runs his college football team who are on a successful run both girls and boys, runs courses for the Cheshire FA and works in talent identification for the Football Association. In August 2007 he made his broadcasting debut as a summariser for BBC Radio Manchester covering the matches of his former club Manchester City on Manchester Sports.

Career statistics
Source:

A.  The "Other" column constitutes appearances and goals in the Anglo-Italian Cup, Football League Trophy, Football League play-offs and Full Members Cup.

Honours
 Manchester City
 Football League Second Division runner-up: 1988–89

 Birmingham City
 Football League Third Division runner-up: 1991–92
 Football League Trophy: 1990–91

 Stoke City
 Football League Second Division: 1992–93

 Newcastle Town
 North West Counties League runner-up: 2005–06

Individual
PFA Team of the Year: 1991–92 Third Division

References

External links
 

1962 births
Living people
Sportspeople from Seaham
Footballers from County Durham
English footballers
Association football midfielders
Seaham Red Star F.C. players
Ipswich Town F.C. players
Manchester City F.C. players
Birmingham City F.C. players
Stoke City F.C. players
Burnley F.C. players
Brentford F.C. players
Northampton Town F.C. players
Altrincham F.C. players
Witton Albion F.C. players
Nantwich Town F.C. players
Newcastle Town F.C. players
English Football League players
English football managers
Witton Albion F.C. managers
Nantwich Town F.C. managers
Newcastle Town F.C. managers
Manchester City F.C. non-playing staff